GSK417651A is a chemical compound which acts as a blocker of the TRPC family of calcium channels, with selectivity for the TRPC3 and TRPC6 subtypes. It has been used to investigate the role of TRPC3/6 channels in heart function.

References 

Thiazoles
Ketones
Nitrogen heterocycles
Amines